Jordana Spiro (born April 12, 1977) is an American actress, director, and writer. As an actress, she has starred in numerous films and television series including Netflix's Ozark and TBS comedy television program My Boys.

Her debut feature Night Comes On, which she directed and co-wrote (with Angelica Nwandu) premiered at the Sundance Film Festival in 2018. She developed the film at the Sundance Institute’s Directors, Screenwriters, and Composers Labs, and through a Cinereach development grant. Her short Skin premiered at Sundance and won the Women In Film Productions award. Skin also won the Honorable Mention Award at SXSW, showed at Telluride, Palm Springs, and AFI among others. Spiro earned her MFA in Film from Columbia University (2015) and received the Adrienne Shelly Foundation Fellowship. She studied drama at the Circle in the Square Theatre School in New York and was selected to join the Berlinale Talent Campus in Berlin.

Early life and education
Spiro was born and raised in New York City. She is Jewish. Spiro has a brother and three sisters. She studied at the Circle in the Square Theatre school and briefly attended the Royal Academy of Dramatic Art in London. In fall 2009, she began the MFA Program in Filmmaking at Columbia University. She finished the degree in 2015. Spiro currently splits her time between Los Angeles and New York.

Career
Spiro's first film role was as Catherine Reece in the 1999 film, From Dusk Till Dawn 3: The Hangman's Daughter, a direct-to-DVD prequel to the 1996 film From Dusk till Dawn.

Spiro starred in the TBS original comedy series My Boys. She played the role of P.J., a twenty-something “guy's girl”, and sports reporter who tries to find romance within her world that is dominated by male friends. The series wrapped its fourth and final season on TBS in 2010.

Spiro also appeared in the 2009 comedy The Goods: Live Hard, Sell Hard alongside Jeremy Piven, Ed Helms and Rob Riggle, and produced by Will Ferrell and Adam McKay. The Goods was directed by Neal Brennan.

Additional credits include The Year of Getting to Know Us which premiered at the 2008 Sundance film festival, IFC's Alone with Her, as well as guest appearances on Cold Case, Out of Practice, and CSI: NY.

Spiro was scheduled to star in the planned 2010–11 television series Love Bites, but fell out of the role in June 2010 due to other contractual obligations. Spiro was also cast alongside Nicolas Cage and Nicole Kidman in the thriller, Trespass. She was a guest star on the Showtime 2011 season of Dexter. For the 2012–13 season, she had the lead role in the Fox-TV medical/crime drama The Mob Doctor.

Recently, Spiro starred as Rachel Garrison in the Netflix crime drama Ozark.

Personal life
She is married to Matthew Spitzer with whom she has a daughter.

Filmography

References

External links

1977 births
Living people
Actresses from New York City
American film actresses
American television actresses
Jewish American actresses
Columbia University School of the Arts alumni
20th-century American actresses
21st-century American actresses
20th-century American Jews
21st-century American Jews